Ini Talkshow (English: This is Talkshow) was an Indonesian talk show running on NET. The program was first aired on 24 March 2014. During Ramadan, this show was also available during Sahur under the name of Ini Sahur (This is Sahur).

Cast
 Sutisna (Sule) as the host
 Andre Taulany as the host's consultant
 Yurike Prastika as Sule's mother (Mami)
 Sas Widjanarko (Mang Saswi) as Sule's uncle
 Muhammad Sulaeman Harsono (Bolot) as the head of the neighborhood (Pak RT)
 Eddy Soepono (Parto) as a security guard
 Tri Retno Prayudati (Nunung)
 Haruka Nakagawa as Sule's niece

External links 

Indonesian television series
2014 Indonesian television series debuts
NET (Indonesian TV network) original programming